Onigiri senbei (おにぎりせんべい) is a Japanese rice ball ("Onigiri")-shaped, soy sauce-flavoured senbei. It was produced by Masuya.(マスヤ)

Japanese cuisine